Chiang Ching-kuo (27 April 1910 – 13 January 1988) was a politician of the Republic of China. The eldest and only biological son of Generalissimo Chiang Kai-shek, he held numerous posts in the government of the Republic of China and ended martial law in 1987. He served as premier of the Republic of China between 1972 and 1978, and was president of the Republic of China from 1978 until his death in 1988.

Born in Zhejiang, Chiang-kuo was sent as a teenager to study in the Soviet Union during the First United Front in 1925, when his father's Nationalist Party and the Chinese Communist Party were in alliance. He attended university there and spoke Russian fluently, but when the Chinese Nationalists violently broke with the Communists, Stalin sent him to work in a steel factory in the Ural Mountains. There, Chiang met and married Faina Vakhreva. With war between China and Japan imminent in 1937, Stalin sent the couple to China. During the war, Ching-kuo's father gradually came to trust him, and gave him more and more responsibilities, including administration.

After the Japanese surrender, Ching-kuo was given the job of ridding Shanghai of corruption, which he attacked with ruthless efficiency. The victory of the Communists in 1949 drove the Chiang family and their ROC government to retreat to Taiwan. Ching-kuo was first given control of the secret police, a position he retained until 1965 and in which he used arbitrary arrests and torture to ensure tight control as part of the White Terror. He then became Minister of Defense (1965–1969), Vice-Premier (1969–1972) and Premier (1972–1978). After his father's death in 1975, he took leadership of the Kuomintang (KMT) as chairman, and was elected president in 1978 and again in 1984.

Under his tenure as president, the government of the Republic of China in Taiwan, while remaining authoritarian, became more open and tolerant of political dissent. Chiang courted Taiwanese voters, and reduced the preference for those who had come from the mainland after the war. Toward the end of his life, Chiang decided to relax government controls on the media and speech, and allowed Han born in Taiwan into positions of power, including his eventual successor Lee Teng-hui. He is the last president of the Republic of China to be born during the rule of the Qing dynasty. Ching-kuo was credited for his Soviet-inspired city planning policies, economic development with Ten Major Construction Projects in Taiwan, efforts to clamp down on corruption, as well as the democratic transition of Taiwan and gradually shifting away from the authoritarian dictatorial rule of his own father Chiang Kai-shek.

Biography

Early life

The son of Chiang Kai-shek and his first wife, Mao Fumei, Chiang Ching-kuo was born in Fenghua, Zhejiang, with the courtesy name of Jiànfēng. He had an adopted brother, Chiang Wei-kuo. "Ching" literally means "longitude", while "kuo" means "nation"; in his brother's name, "wei" literally means "parallel (of latitude)". The names are inspired by the references in Chinese classics such as the Guoyu, in which "to draw the longitudes and latitudes of the world" is used as a metaphor for a person with great abilities, especially in managing a country.

While the young Chiang Ching-kuo had a good relationship with his mother and grandmother (who were deeply rooted to their Buddhist faith), his relationship with his father was strict, utilitarian and often rocky. Chiang Kai-shek appeared to his son as an authoritarian figure, sometimes indifferent to his problems. Even in personal letters between the two, Chiang Kai-shek would sternly order his son to improve his Chinese calligraphy. From 1916 until 1919 Chiang Ching-kuo attended the "Grammar School" in Wushan in Hsikou. Then, in 1920, his father hired tutors to teach him the Four Books, the central texts of Confucianism. On 4 June 1921, Ching-kuo's grandmother died. What might have been an immense emotional loss was compensated for when Chiang Kai-shek moved the family to Shanghai. Chiang Ching-kuo's stepmother, historically known as the Chiang family's "Shanghai Mother", went with them. During this period Chiang Kai-shek concluded that Chiang Ching-kuo was a son to be taught, while Chiang Wei-kuo was a son to be loved.

During his time in Shanghai, Chiang Ching-kuo was supervised by his father and made to write a weekly letter of 200–300 Chinese characters. Chiang Kai-shek also underlined the importance of classical books and of learning English, two areas he was hardly proficient in himself. On 20 March 1924, Chiang Ching-kuo was able to present to his now-nationally famous father a proposal concerning the grass-roots organization of the rural population in Hsikou. Chiang Ching-kuo planned to provide free education to allow people to read and to write at least 1000 characters. In his own words:
I have a suggestion to make about the Wushan School, although I do not know if you can agree to it. My suggestion is that the school establish a night school for common people who cannot afford to go to the regular school. My school established a night school with great success. I can tell you something about the night school:
Name: Wuschua School for the Common People
Tuition fee: Free of charge with stationery supplied
Class hours: 7 pm to 9 pm
Age limit: 14 or older
Schooling protocol: 16 or 20 weeks.
At the time of the graduation, the trainees will be able to write simple letters and keep simple accounts. They will be issued a diploma if they pass the examinations. The textbooks they used were published by the Commercial Press and were entitled "One thousand characters for the common people." I do not know whether you will accept my suggestion. If a night school is established at Wushan, it will greatly benefit the local people.

In early 1925, Chiang entered Shanghai's Pudong College, but Chiang Kai-shek decided to send him on to Beijing because of warlord action and spontaneous student protests in Shanghai. In Beijing, he attended the school organized by a friend of his father, Wu Zhihui, a renowned scholar and linguist. The school combined classical and modern approaches to education. While there, Ching-kuo started to identify himself as a progressive revolutionary and participated in the flourishing social scene inside the young Communist community. The idea of studying in Moscow now seized his imagination. Within the help program provided by the Soviet Union to the countries of East Asia there was a training school that later became the Moscow Sun Yat-sen University. The participants to the university were selected by the CPSU and KMT members, with a participation of CPC Central Committee.

Chiang Ching-kuo asked Wu Zhihui to name him as a KMT candidate. Wu did not try to dissuade him, even though Wu was a key figure of the right-leaning and anti-Communist "Western Hills Group" of the KMT. In the summer of 1925, Chiang Ching-kuo traveled south to Whampoa Military Academy to discuss his plans for study in Moscow with his father. Chiang Kai-shek was not keen, but after a discussion with Chen Guofu he finally agreed. In a 1996 interview, Ch'en's brother, Chen Li-fu, recalled that Chiang Kai-shek accepted the plan because of the need to have Soviet support at a time when his hold over the KMT was tenuous.

Moscow
With or without his father's enthusiastic approval, Chiang Ching-kuo went on to Moscow in late 1925. He stayed in the Soviet Union for nearly twelve years. While there, Chiang was given the Russian name Nikolai Vladimirovich Elizarov (Николай Владимирович Елизаров) and put under the tutelage of Karl Radek at the Communist University of the Toilers of the East. Noted for having an exceptional grasp of international politics, his classmates included other children of influential Chinese families, most notably the future Chinese Communist party leader, Deng Xiaoping. Chiang Ching-kuo joined the Communist Youth League under Deng. Soon Ching-kuo was an enthusiastic student of Communist ideology, particularly Trotskyism and he presumably came to support Stalinism; though following the Great Purge, Joseph Stalin privately met with him and ordered him to publicly denounce Trotskyism. Chiang even applied to be a member of the All-Union Communist Party, although his request was denied.

In April 1927, however, Chiang Kai-shek purged KMT leftists, had Communists arrested or killed, and expelled his Soviet advisers. Chiang Ching-kuo responded from Moscow with an editorial that harshly criticized his father's actions but was nonetheless detained as a "guest" of the Soviet Union, a practical hostage. Debate still continues as to whether he was forced to write the editorial, but he had seen Trotskyist friends arrested and killed by the Soviet secret police. The Soviet government sent him to work in the Ural Heavy Machinery Plant, a steel factory in the Urals, Yekaterinburg (then Sverdlovsk), where he met Faina Ipat'evna Vakhreva, a native Belarusian. They married on 15 March 1935, and she would later take the Chinese name, Chiang Fang-liang. In December of that year, their son, Hsiao-wen was born.

Chiang Kai-shek refused to negotiate a prisoner swap for his son in exchange for a Chinese Communist Party leader. He wrote in his diary, "It is not worth it to sacrifice the interest of the country for the sake of my son." In 1937, he maintained that "I would rather have no offspring than sacrifice our nation's interests", since he had no intention of stopping the war against the Communists.

Return to China and WWII
Stalin allowed Chiang Ching-kuo to return to China with his Belarusian wife and son in April 1937 after living in the USSR for 12 years.

By then, the NRA under Chiang Kai-shek and the Communists under Mao Zedong had signed a ceasefire to create the Second United Front and fight the Japanese invasion of China, which began in July 1937. Stalin hoped the Chinese would keep Japan from invading the Soviet Pacific coast, and he hoped to form an anti-Japanese alliance with the senior Chiang.

On Ching-kuo's return, his father assigned a tutor, Hsu Dau-lin, to assist with his readjustment to China. Chiang Ching-Kuo was appointed as a specialist in remote districts of Jiangxi where he was credited with training of cadres and fighting corruption, opium consumption, and illiteracy. Chiang Ching-kuo was appointed as commissioner of Gannan Prefecture between 1939 and 1945; there he banned smoking, gambling and prostitution, studied governmental management, allowed for economic expansion and a change in social outlook. His efforts were hailed as a miracle in the political war in China, then coined as the "Gannan New Deal". During his time in Gannan, from 1940 he implemented a "public information desk" where ordinary people could visit him if they had problems, and according to records, Chiang Ching-kuo received a total of 1,023 people during such sessions in 1942.

In regard to the ban on prostitution and closing of brothels, Chiang implemented a policy where former prostitutes became employed in factories. Due to the large number of refugees in Ganzhou as a result from the ongoing war, thousands of orphans lived on the street; in June 1942, Chiang Ching-kuo formally established the Chinese Children's Village in the outskirts of Ganzhou, with facilities such as a nursery, kindergarten, primary school, hospital and gymnasium. During the last years of the 1930s, he met Wang Sheng, with whom he would remain close for the next 50 years.

The paramilitary "Sanmin Zhuyi Youth Corps" was under Chiang's control. Chiang used the term "big bourgeoisie", in a disparaging manner to call H.H. Kung and T. V. Soong.

While in mainland China, Chiang and his wife had a daughter, Hsiao-chang, born in Nanchang (1938), and two more sons, Hsiao-wu, born in Chungking (1945), and Hsiao-yung, born in Shanghai (1948).

Relationship with Chang Ya-juo and her death 
Chiang met Chang Ya-juo when she was working at a training camp for enlistees and he was serving as the head of Gannan Prefecture during the war. The two had a relationship that brought twin sons: Chang Hsiao-tz'u and Chang Hsiao-yen, born in 1942. In August 1942, Chang felt sick at a dinner party, and died the next day in a Guilin hospital. The circumstances of her death raised speculation that it was murder. Over the years, many of her relatives, including her sons and highly ranked ex-security personnel, insisted that KMT's security apparatus orchestrated her murder to keep a lid on CCK's marital affair, and to protect CCK's political career.

Hostage claim 
Jung Chang and Jon Halliday claim Chiang Kai-shek allowed the Communists to escape on the 1934–1935 Long March because he wanted Stalin to return Chiang Ching-kuo. This is contradicted by Chiang Kai-shek's diary, "It is not worth it to sacrifice the interest of the country for the sake of my son." He refused to negotiate for a prisoner swap of his son in exchange for the Chinese Communist Party leader. Again in 1937 he stated about his son: "I would rather have no offspring than sacrifice our nation's interests." Chiang had absolutely no intention of stopping the war against the Communists. 
Chang and Halliday likewise claim that Chiang Ching-kuo was "kidnapped" in spite of the evidence that he went to study in the Soviet Union with his father's own approval.

Economic policies in Shanghai

After the Second Sino-Japanese War and during the Chinese Civil War, Chiang Ching-kuo briefly served as a liaison administrator in Shanghai, trying to eradicate the corruption and hyperinflation that plagued the city. He was determined to do this because of the fears arising from the Nationalists' increasing lack of popularity during the Civil War. Given the task of arresting dishonest businessmen who hoarded supplies for profit during the inflationary spiral, he attempted to assuage the business community by explaining that his team would only go after big war profiteers.

Chiang Ching-kuo copied Soviet methods, which he learned during his stay in the Soviet Union, to start a social revolution by attacking middle class merchants. He also enforced low prices on all goods to raise support from the Proletariat.

As riots broke out and savings were ruined, bankrupting shopowners, Chiang Ching-kuo began to attack the wealthy, seizing assets and placing them under arrest. The son of the gangster Du Yuesheng was arrested by him. Ching-kuo ordered KMT agents to raid the Yangtze Development Corporation's warehouses, which was privately owned by H.H. Kung and his family, as the company was accused of hoarding supplies. H.H. Kung's wife was Soong Ai-ling, the sister of Soong Mei-ling who was Chiang Ching-kuo's stepmother. H.H. Kung's son David was arrested, and the Kungs responded by blackmailing the Chiangs, threatening to release information about them. He was eventually freed after negotiations, and Chiang Ching-kuo resigned, ending the terror on the Shanghainese merchants.

Political career in Taiwan

After the Nationalists lost control of mainland China to the Communists in the Chinese Civil War, Chiang Ching-kuo followed his father and the retreating Nationalist forces to Taiwan. On 8 December 1949, the Nationalist capital was moved from Chengdu to Taipei, and early on 10 December 1949, Communist troops laid siege to Chengdu, the last KMT-controlled city on mainland China. Chiang Kai-shek and Chiang Ching-kuo directed the city's defense from the Chengdu Central Military Academy, before the aircraft May-ling evacuated them to Taiwan; they would never return to mainland China.

In 1950, Chiang's father appointed him director of the secret police, which he remained until 1965. An enemy of the Chiang family, Wu Kuo-chen, was kicked out of his position of governor of Taiwan by Chiang Ching-kuo and fled to America in 1953. Chiang Ching-kuo, educated in the Soviet Union, initiated Soviet-style military organization in the Republic of China Military, reorganizing and Sovietizing the political officer corps, surveillance, and KMT party activities were propagated throughout the military. Opposed to this was Sun Li-jen, who was educated at the American Virginia Military Institute.

Chiang orchestrated the controversial court-martial and arrest of General Sun Li-jen in August 1955, allegedly for plotting a coup d'état with the American CIA against his father. General Sun was a popular Chinese war hero from the Burma Campaign against the Japanese and remained under house arrest until Chiang Ching-kuo's death in 1988. Ching-kuo also approved the arbitrary arrest and torture of prisoners. Chiang Ching-kuo's activities as director of the secret police remained widely criticized as heralding a long era of human rights abuses in Taiwan.

From 1955 to 1960, Chiang administered the construction and completion of Taiwan's highway system. Chiang's father elevated him to high office when he was appointed as the ROC Defense Minister from 1965 until 1969. He was the nation's Vice Premier between 1969 and 1972, during which he survived a 1970 assassination attempt while visiting the U.S. Afterwards he was appointed the nation's Premier between 1972 and 1978. As Chiang Kai-shek entered his final years, he gradually gave more responsibilities to his son, and when he died in April 1975, Vice President Yen Chia-kan became president for the balance of Chiang Kai-shek's term, while Chiang Ching-kuo succeeded to the leadership of the KMT (he opted for the title "Chairman" rather than the elder Chiang's title of "Director-General").

Presidency
Chiang Ching-kuo was elected president of the ROC in the 1978 Taiwanese presidential election by the National Assembly on 20 May 1978. He was reelected to another term in the 1984 Taiwanese presidential election. Starting from the 1970s when his father grew sick, Chiang became the de facto leader of the regime and reformed many of his father's autocratic policies and gradually phased out of the white terror by allowing the freedom of peaceful assemblies and political pluralism of the Tangwai movement, which later became the DPP. Chiang also turned down many of the suggestions of the conservatives in the KMT regime to violently suppress the protesters.

In a move he launched the "Ten Major Construction Projects" and the "Twelve New Development Projects" which contributed to the "Taiwan Miracle". Among his accomplishments was accelerating the process of economic modernization to give Taiwan a 13% growth rate, $4,600 per capita income, and the world's second largest foreign exchange reserves. On 16 December 1978, U.S. president Jimmy Carter announced that the United States would no longer recognize the ROC as the legitimate government of China. Under the Taiwan Relations Act, the United States would continue to sell weapons to Taiwan, but the TRA was purposely vague in any promise of defending Taiwan in the event of an invasion.

Chiang Ching-kuo also enacted major Labor rights reforms throughout the 1970s and the 1980s that addressed child labor, women’s employment, working time, pensions, paid leave, employment contract with several legislations such as the “Labor Safety and Hygiene Law” in 1974 and the “Factory Law” in 1975. The average salary of Taiwanese workers tripled under his rule. Chiang Ching-kuo also loosened the harsh anti-strike laws and union busting practice, thus giving the labor movement more opportunity to bargain for fairer wages as he lifted the martial law provisions.

In an effort to bring more Taiwan-born citizens into government services, Chiang Ching-kuo "exiled" his over-ambitious chief of General Political Warfare Department, General Wang Sheng, to Paraguay as an ambassador (November 1983), and hand-picked Lee Teng-hui as vice-president of the ROC (formally elected May 1984), first-in-the-line of succession to the presidency. Chiang emphatically declared that his successor would not be from the Chiang family in a Constitution Day speech on 25 December 1985:

Chiang Wei-kuo, Chiang's younger brother, would later repudiate the declaration in 1990 after he was selected as a vice-presidential candidate.

On 15 July 1987, Chiang finally ended martial law and allowed family visits to the mainland. The ban on tourism to Hong Kong and Macau was also lifted. His administration saw a gradual loosening of political controls and opponents of the Nationalists were no longer forbidden to hold meetings or publish political criticism papers.

Opposition political parties, though still formally illegal, were allowed to operate without harassment or arrest. When the Democratic Progressive Party was established on 28 September 1986, President Chiang decided against dissolving the group or persecuting its leaders, but its candidates officially ran in elections as independents in the Tangwai movement.

Chiang Ching-kuo also increased the political representation of Native Taiwanese under his rule, allowing them to have various positions, which paved the way for Lee Teng-hui to come to power and further democratize Taiwan.

Death and legacy

Chiang Ching-kuo died at Taipei Veterans General Hospital on 13 January 1988, aged 77, from a heart attack. He used a wheelchair during the last months of his life, and also had diabetes, alongside vision and heart problems.
He was interred temporarily in Daxi Township, Taoyuan County (now Daxi District, Taoyuan City), but in a separate mausoleum in Touliao, a mile down the road from his father's burial place. The hope was to have both buried at their birthplace in Fenghua once mainland China was recovered. Composer Hwang Yau-tai wrote the Chiang Ching-kuo Memorial Song in 1988.

In January 2004, Chiang Fang-liang asked that both father and son be buried at Wuchih Mountain Military Cemetery in Hsichih, Taipei County (now New Taipei City). The state funeral ceremony was initially planned for Spring 2005, but was eventually delayed to winter 2005. It may be further delayed due to the recent death of Chiang Ching-kuo's oldest daughter-in-law, who had served as the de facto head of the household since Chiang Fang-liang's death in 2004. Chiang Fang-liang and Soong Mei-ling had agreed in 1997 that the former leaders be first buried, but still be moved to mainland China.

Murray A. Rubinstein called Chiang Ching-kuo more of a civilian leader than his father, whom Rubenstein refers to as a "quasi-warlord."

Jay Taylor has described Chiang Ching-kuo as a figure who mixed the ideologies of Soviet communism, Chinese nationalism, Taiwanese localism and American democracy, who became the helmsman of the democratization of Taiwan.

Unlike his highly controversial father, Chiang Ching-kuo's reputation is overwhelmingly positive among the Taiwanese population as the people of Taiwan recognizes his economic and social achievements, as well as his efforts of democratization. 38.7% of the population considers him the best president who contributed the most to Taiwan, and he was rated 84.8/100 by the Taiwanese population.

Memorials

Road names
Jingguo road (in Hsinchu)
Jingguo road (in Taoyuan)

The Republic of China Air Force
The AIDC, the ROC's air defense company, has nicknamed its AIDC F-CK Indigenous Defense Fighter the Ching Kuo in his memory.

Coin
 27 April 2010.  [Coin commemorating the 100th anniversary of Chiang Ching-kuo's birth]

Song
 Chiang Ching-kuo Memorial Song

Family

Wife: Faina Chiang Fang-liang, Chiang and she had 3 sons and 1 daughter. 
First son: Alan Chiang Hsiao-wen (14 December 1935 – 14 April 1989)
 Chiang Yu-mei (1961–), British Chinese.
First daughter: Chiang Hsiao-chang (1938–), married to Yu Yang-ho until his death in 2010. 
Theodore Yu Tsu-sheng
Second son: Alex Chiang Hsiao-wu (25 April 1945 – 1 July 1991)
 Alexandra Chiang Yo-lan
 Johnathan Chiang Yo-sung, married in 2002.
a daughter (May 2003–)
Third son: Eddie Chiang Hsiao-yung (1 October 1948 – 22 December 1996) 
 Demos Chiang Yo-bo (10 September 1976–), DEM Inc founder. He was married in 2003 to Ms Lin Hen Yi.
Chiang De Xi (10 July 2003–)
Chiang De Yung (2005–)
 Edward Chiang Yo-chang (9 November 1978–)
 Andrew Chiang Yo-ching (14 June 1990–)
Mistress: Chang Ya-juo (1913–1942), Chiang and she had 2 sons.
Winston Chang Hsiao-tzu
Chang Ching-sung, married on 2 November 1999.
Chang Yu-chu (1978–)
John Chiang Hsiao-yen
Vivian Chang (?–), married in 2004.
Chiang Hui-yun (1977–), married on 29 April 2007.
Chiang Wan-an (26 December 1978–), married in 2008.
Chiang De Ri (June 2011–), born in the United States.

Family tree

See also

Chiang Ching-kuo Foundation

History of the Republic of China
Military of the Republic of China
National Revolutionary Army
Politics of the Republic of China
Seven Seas Residence
Sino-German cooperation until 1941

Notes

References

Citations

Sources 
 Books cited

Further reading
 Matray, James I., ed. East Asia and the United States: an encyclopedia of relations since 1784. Vol. 1 (Greenwood, 2002) 1:274–275.

External links

 ROC Government biography
 Remembering Chiang Ching-kuo
 1981 GIO video: Hello, Mr. President-Chiang Ching-kuo and His People
 Kuomintang Official Website
 Corpus of Political Speeches Free access to political speeches by Chiang Ching-kuo and other Chinese politicians, developed by Hong Kong Baptist University Library

|-

|-

 
1910 births
1988 deaths
Presidents of the Republic of China on Taiwan
Chinese anti-communists
Chinese people of World War II
Politicians from Ningbo
Premiers of the Republic of China on Taiwan
Chinese Methodists
Chinese Nationalist heads of state
Chairpersons of the Kuomintang
Republic of China politicians from Zhejiang
Taiwanese Ministers of National Defense
Taiwanese Ministers of the Veterans Affairs Council
Chinese expatriates in the Soviet Union
Moscow Sun Yat-sen University alumni
Children of national leaders of China
Chinese Civil War refugees
Taiwanese people from Zhejiang
Communist University of the Toilers of the East alumni
Chinese diarists
20th-century diarists